Entente Sportive Uzès Pont du Gard was a French association football club founded in 2005. The club was formed as a result of a merger between two teams; ES Pont du Gard and Gallia Club d'Uzès. They were based in the town of Uzès and their home stadium was the Stade Pautex. In the 2013–14 season, they played in the Championnat National league.

The club was dissolved in August 2015.

References

External links
ES Uzès Pont du Gard official website 

 
Uzes Pont du Gard
Uzes Pont du Gard
Uzes Pont du Gard
2005 establishments in France
2015 disestablishments in France
Sport in Gard
Football clubs in Occitania (administrative region)